Burraq is a Mine-Resistant Ambush Protected (MRAP) Vehicle currently being developed by Heavy Industries Taxila (HIT) of Pakistan. It is a 4x4 Protected vehicle based on the chassis of the Isuzu NPS-75 commercial truck so as to reduce the cost and facilitate the delivery of spare parts. In appearance, the Burraq is quite similar to the Wildcat MRAP, developed by the  Israel Military Industries (IMI).

Development 
Heavy Industries Taxila (HIT) commenced the development of the Burraq MRAP in 2009 to meet Pakistan Army's requirement for cheaper Mine Resistant Ambush Protected Vehicle's as lack of financial resources hampered its plans to acquire protected vehicles from United States, Germany and Turkey.

The Burraq was first seen on Pakistan state media briefly in February 2010.

In June 2011, International Defence Review reported that five prototypes / pre-production models of the Burraq MRAP were completed for trails & development work by Heavy Industries Taxila.

On 19 March 2013, Heavy Industries Taxila (HIT) announced that its Burraq MRAP Vehicle was nearing the end of its prototype phase and would be unveiled in next three to four months.

In October 2013, a spokesman of Heavy Industries Taxila said, “Burraq is on hold,” but gave no reason.

Design

Armament 

The Burraq MRAP Vehicle is armed with a remote controlled .50-caliber heavy machine gun. It also has 4 smoke grenades (2 at front, 2 at rear) used to create smoke screens or to provide opportunity for movement over ground covered by fire.

Mobility 
The Burraq MRAP is powered by an Isuzu NPS-75 engine delivering 150 horsepower (110 kW). The Isuzu NPS-75 engine originally drives a manual transmission with an option of automatic transmission also. Capable of manual and automatic power-shifting, the transmission has  5 forward and 1 reverse speed(s).

The suspension consists of hydraulic dampers and leaf springs with telescopic shock absorbers, which provide a stable firing platform while the vehicle is moving at speed over rough terrain particularly in North-West Pakistan.

The vehicle weighs around 8−10 tonnes and has a power-to-weight ratio of 15-18 hp/tonne.

Protection 
 Protection against IED's: The Burraq MRAP Vehicle can withstand IED blasts of up to 10 kg. It uses a V-shaped hull & raised crew compartment to increase vehicle & crew survivability by deflecting an upward directed blast from an IED (or landmine) away from the vehicle. The occupants sit on blast mitigating seats.
 Protection against bullets up to 12.7 mm caliber: The troops compartment of the Burraq MRAP Vehicle provides B7 Plus Protection against 12.7 mm caliber rounds fired from a distance of 200 m. It can be fitted with add-on armor to withstand 14.5 mm caliber rounds.
 Protection against RPGs: The armor of the Burraq MRAP cannot withstand hits from Rocket Propelled Grenades, particularly the RPG-7. However, it can be fitted with add-on armor or bar/slat armor to withstand RPG hits.

Carrying Capacity 
The Burraq MRAP can carry 12 passengers including a crew of two (Commander, driver).

It can also be used to transport military supplies to areas having rough terrain.

Export 
Pakistan wants to offer the Burraq MRAP vehicle for export, apparently hoping to gain market share based on low price.

Potential Operators 

Pakistan Army

See also 
 Heavy Industries Taxila
 Mine-Resistant Ambush Protected Vehicle
 Armoured personnel carrier
 Mohafiz Internal Security Vehicle

References

External links 
 Burraq MRAP Vehicle
 Pakistani MRAP: Burraq (IMAGE)
 Sri Lankan Army Chief on a visit to HIT, with MRAP in the background

Video clip 

Wheeled armoured fighting vehicles
Armoured personnel carriers
Armoured fighting vehicles of Pakistan
Armoured personnel carriers of the post–Cold War period